
 is a Japanese manga writer and illustrator from Fukui Prefecture who has been writing manga since 1998. This name is one of her two pen names that she writes under when drawing manga, the other being . Under the name Taishi Zaō, she writes boys love and girls love manga while under Mikiyo Tsuda she writes comedy-shōjo manga. Her reasons for doing this mainly had to do with keeping the fact that she drew manga centered on homosexual relationships from her family but they eventually found out anyway. Many manga artists often adopt artistic personas for themselves in order to represent themselves in sections of their manga not attributed to the story, as in an author's note section. Mikiyo Tsuda's persona is that of a teddy bear wearing a red bow tie with a bell at its center.

One of her friends, and also a fellow manga artist, is Eiki Eiki. They often co-author manga together, display their art together, and have autograph sessions together. Eiki Eiki has even been known to sometimes act as Taishi Zaō's manager.

Works

Written as Mikiyo Tsuda
The Day of Revolution (1999)
Family Complex (2000)
Princess Princess (2002)
Princess Princess + (2006)
Atsumare! Gakuen Tengoku (2008)

Written as Taishi Zaō
Electric Hands (1998)
Koi wa Ina Mono Myōna Mono (2002)
Bokutachi wa Asu ni Mukatte Ikiru no da (2005)
Aruji no Ōse no Mama ni (2005)
Brothers Battle
Her - included in Haru Natsu Aki Fuyu

Co-authored with Eiki Eiki
Color (1999)
Haru Natsu Aki Fuyu (2007) - a collection of stories that were serialized in Yuri Hime, such as She-Wolf and First Kiss.
Love DNA Double X (2009)
Love Stage!! (2010)
Back Stage!! (2010)

References

External links
Mikiyo Tsuda's personal website 

 
Japanese female comics artists
Female comics writers
Living people
Women manga artists
Manga artists from Fukui Prefecture
Japanese women writers
Year of birth missing (living people)